The Feather River Route is a rail line that was built and operated by the Western Pacific Railroad. It was constructed between 1906 and 1909, and connects the cities of Oakland, California, and Salt Lake City, Utah. The line was built to compete with the Central Pacific Railroad (and later Southern Pacific Railroad), which at the time held a nearly complete monopoly on Northern California rail service. The route derives its name from its crossing of the Sierra Nevada, where it follows both the North and Middle Forks of the Feather River. The route is famous for its impressive engineering qualities and its considerable scenic value. All of the route is now owned and operated by the Union Pacific Railroad; however, the Union Pacific has transferred significant portions of the route to other lines. The portion still called the Feather River Route by the Union Pacific runs from the California Central Valley to Winnemucca, Nevada and has been divided into three subdivisions named the Sacramento, Canyon and Winnemucca subdivisions.

History

Early history 
Interest in building a transportation artery through the Feather River Canyon and across the deserts of Nevada and Utah began with the discovery of Beckwourth Pass, in the Sierra Nevada, in 1850. In the 1860s, Arthur W. Keddie began surveying in the Feather River Canyon, in order to find a suitable route for such an artery. He eventually found such a route, and helped to found the Oroville and Virginia City Railroad Company in 1867 to build a railroad along it. Political pressure from the Central Pacific Railroad, among other factors, led to the end of all construction efforts by 1869.

Throughout the 1870s and 1880s, little progress was made in forming a company to construct the railroad line. Some interest remained, because the proposed route was much less steep and passed through the Sierras at a point  lower than that of the recently finished First transcontinental railroad, owned by the Central Pacific Railroad between Sacramento and Ogden, Utah. The Union Pacific Railroad, which terminated in Ogden at the time, considered building the line multiple times throughout this era to bypass the Central Pacific and access the Pacific Coast on its own. None of these proposals resulted in any level of action, and the idea was widely considered dead by the 1890s.

Interest in a line through the Feather River Canyon was renewed in 1900, when the Union Pacific Railroad, then led by E. H. Harriman, took control of the Southern Pacific Railroad. Subsequently, Harriman decided to close off access to the Southern Pacific to all railroads other than the Union Pacific, leaving all other railroads unable to access the Pacific Coast from Salt Lake City. Foremost among these railroads was the Denver and Rio Grande Western Railroad, the westernmost part of an  transcontinental rail network organized by Jay Gould. Jay's son and successor, George Gould, decided obtain access to the Pacific Coast. Hence, on April 3, 1903, the Western Pacific Railroad, backed heavily by Gould, was founded in San Francisco.

Construction 

Construction of the line began in 1906 and continued under harsh conditions. In the Sierra a total absence of roads, along with rockslides in the Feather River Canyon and extreme temperature fluctuation, made working conditions uncomfortable and dangerous. In the deserts of Nevada and Utah high temperature and lack of water made conditions similarly difficult; construction costs skyrocketed, nearly bankrupting the contractors building the line. Labor turnover was extremely high, due to the miserable working conditions. Nonetheless, progress inched further, although slower than anticipated, due to the challenges caused by the need for many long tunnels on the Sierra portion of the route.

It featured a ruling grade of 1%, making it only half as steep as Southern Pacific's Donner Pass line, its primary competitor.

History under the Western Pacific 

 This did not stop the Western Pacific from introducing the California Zephyr in 1949. The Zephyr, which operated over three railroads on its route between Oakland and Chicago, gained immense recognition but failed to last past the year 1970, when lack of riders and unprofitability forced the Western Pacific to abandon the service.

In 1957, a portion of the route between Oroville and Intake had to be relocated to make way for the Oroville Dam. The new line features the North Fork Bridge,

Shared trackage agreement 
The Feather River Route parallels the Overland Route in central Nevada between Weso (near Winnemucca) and Alazon (near Wells). The Southern Pacific Railroad and Western Pacific came to a shared trackage agreement to use directional running. Eastbound trains of both companies used the tracks for the Feather River Route while westbound trains used the Overland Route. In the shared track area, the tracks mostly run on opposite sides of the Humboldt River; at some points the two lines are several miles apart. Crossovers were constructed where the lines run in close proximity to allow bi-directional service to the areas previously only accessible from one of the lines, such as Battle Mountain. There is a grade separated crossover of the two lines in the shared track area near Palisade, Nevada. This results in trains following right hand traffic in the eastern half of the shared track area, but left hand traffic in the western half.

By 1967, a second section of the Feather River Route was converted to directional running. The easternmost portion of the line (Shafter Subdivision), from the Kennecott Smokestack of the Bingham Canyon Mine smelting facilities to the end of the line in downtown Salt Lake City was operationally combined with the Lynndyl Subdivision of the former Los Angeles and Salt Lake Railroad for a continuous dual track into Salt Lake City. Initially this required a crossover between the two tracks. When the WP and UP merged in 1983, the crossover was eliminated.

Present

The Western Pacific was purchased by the Union Pacific Railroad in 1983. In 1996, the Union Pacific acquired the Southern Pacific, resulting in both lines between Oakland and Utah being owned by the same company. After the acquisition, the Union Pacific truncated the Feather River Route to the meeting points of the two lines near Sacramento, California and Winnemucca, Nevada. 

The far western portion of the line, west of Stockton, now the Oakland Subdivision, is now used by the Altamont Corridor Express. A portion of the line through downtown Sacramento is now used by the Blue Line of the Sacramento Regional Transit District. East of Winnemucca, the former Feather River Route has been combined with lines from the former Denver and Rio Grande Western Railroad to form the Central Corridor. 

The Western Pacific Railroad Museum, a preservation society founded in 1984, is located next to the Union Pacific rail yard in Portola, California. The remaining portion of the Feather River Route follows a corridor similar to that of State Route 70 in California and former State Route 49 in Nevada.

Points of interest 
 Lake Oroville
 Tobin Bridges
 Pulga Bridges
 Keddie Wye
 North Fork Bridge
 Williams Loop
 Spring Garden Tunnel
 Clio trestle
 Western Pacific Railroad Museum
 Beckwourth Pass / Chilcoot Tunnel
 Black Rock Desert
Along portions built as part of the Feather River Route that are currently assigned to other lines:
 Niles Canyon
 Altamont Pass
 Carlin Tunnel
 Flower Pass tunnel
 Arnold Loop/Silver Zone Pass
 Bonneville Salt Flats
 Saltair Resort

Lines served 
Oakland Subdivision (Oakland - ACE Maintenance Facility Stockton)
Sacramento Subdivision (Stockton - Oroville)
Canyon Subdivision (Oroville - Portola)
Winnemucca Subdivision (Portola - Weso, Nevada (junction near Winnemucca, Nevada))
Elko Subdivision (Weso - Elko Freight Yards)
Shafter Subdivision (Elko - Smelter (Kennecott Smokestack))
Lynndyl Subdivision (Smelter - Salt Lake City)

References 

 
 

Western Pacific Railroad
Feather River
History of Plumas County, California
Transportation in Plumas County, California
Rail lines in California
Union Pacific Railroad lines